Tukita is a rural locality (a selo) in Khasavyurtovsky District, Republic of Dagestan, Russia. The population was 588 as of 2010. There are 14 streets.

Geography 
Tukita is located 34 km north of Khasavyurt (the district's administrative centre) by road. Inkhelo is the nearest rural locality.

References 

Rural localities in Khasavyurtovsky District